Fraserburgh railway station is a former railway station that once served the town of Fraserburgh, Aberdeenshire.

History 
The station was the terminus of the Formartine and Buchan Railway from Aberdeen. The principal traffic was fish, as Fraserburgh was an important herring harbour, as well as dealing in whale products, especially whale oil.

The Fraserburgh and St Combs Light Railway opened in 1903, connecting small harbours on the coast from St Combs. These lines, and the station, are now closed, and the site has been redeveloped.  The former engine shed and goods offices remain in alternative uses.

Fraserburgh railway station opened on 24 April 1865 and closed to passengers on 4 October 1965. It was known as Fraserburgh for Rosehearty and New Aberdour in Bradshaw until 1938. The railway line was built by the Formartine and Buchan Railway Company, which became part of the Great North of Scotland Railway. In 1923 the GNSR was incorporated into the London and North Eastern Railway, which was in turn nationalised on 1 January 1948. Passenger services on the Buchan lines were withdrawn in 1965 as part of the Beeching cuts. Freight trains continued to operate Fraserburgh until 1979. The track was subsequently lifted. The closest operating station is currently Inverurie.

References

 

Disused railway stations in Aberdeenshire
Railway stations in Great Britain opened in 1865
Beeching closures in Scotland
Railway stations in Great Britain closed in 1965
Former Great North of Scotland Railway stations
Buildings and structures in Fraserburgh
1865 establishments in Scotland
1979 disestablishments in the United Kingdom